Wood River is a waterway in Alaska as well as a location outside Dillingham, Alaska by Wood River Road and the Wood River. The Wood River Lakes Trail is used for backcountry float trips. The Wood River Mountains are nearby. Wood River Road is one of the areas transportation routes. The rivers source is the Aleknagik Lake. The river runs past  Dillingham where it meets the Nushagak River and enters Nushagak Bay. Nushagak was a former trading post by the area where the rivers met.

Towers used for counting salmon are located in Wood River. Icicle Seafoods is headquartered there and has a salmon processing plant is located along the river in Dilingham.

Gallery

See also
List of rivers of Alaska
Nushagak River
Wood-Tikchik State Park

References

Rivers of Alaska
Rivers of Dillingham Census Area, Alaska